Prayar Gopalakrishnan (20 September 1949 – 4 June 2022) was an Indian National Congress politician from Kollam, India. He was the president of Travancore Devaswom Board. He was an MLA of Kerala and a member of KPCC. Prayar began his political career through Kerala Students Union. He was the Kollam district president of KSU and youth congress. He was elected to Kerala legislative assembly from Chadayamangalam constituency in 2001. He died on 4 June 2022 due to heart attack.

References

1949 births
2022 deaths
Politicians from Kollam district
Members of the Kerala Legislative Assembly
Indian National Congress politicians from Kerala